The Château de Purnon is a historic French château located in the commune of Verrue in the department of Vienne.

Constructed during the reign of Louis XVI the château was completed just prior to the commencement of the French Revolution.  The château is flanked by two enormous outbuildings featuring rare charpente in the style of Philibert de l'Orme. A  grand allée traverses the Forêt de Scévolles from the north of the domain.

In 1893, Purnon was purchased by Daniel Jérôme Robineau de Rochequairie, Marquis de Rochequairie (1856–1919).  His descendants sold the estate to its current owners in 2020.

The château and the two main outbuildings, the dry moat, the terraces and the northern entrance gate were all classified as Historical Monuments on May 10, 1995. The Moulin Bigeard, the potager garden and pavilion, the rare Eolienne Bollée and its reservoir were listed as Historic Monuments on December 11, 1992 

In 2019 the château was purchased by Australian politician Tim Holding for €709,685. Holding and his wife are undertaking currently a full restoration of the house.

References 

Châteaux in Vienne